Vicky Tiu Cayetano (born 1955 or 1956) is an American businesswoman and politician who was the first lady of Hawaii from 1997 to 2002.  She and Governor Ben Cayetano were married on May 5, 1997, in Washington Place. During her tenure, she was instrumental in the construction of a new governor's residence building and turning Washington Place into a museum. She was a Democratic candidate in the 2022 Hawaii gubernatorial election.

Early life
Vicky Tiu was born in Manila, Philippines, one of nine musically talented children of Pat and William Tiu. She and her brother and sisters appeared in movies, including It Happened at the World's Fair. Sisters Ginny and Elizabeth, and their brother Alexander, were in Girls! Girls! Girls! with Elvis. After the family moved to San Francisco, Vicky and a group of her friends started a travel agency when she was a teenager. She later attended Stanford University in California, but did not graduate.

Career 
In 1988, she helped to start United Laundry Company to service hotels and hospitals, eventually becoming president and CEO.

First lady 
After marrying Ben Cayetano, she continued to operate the laundry company, but spent less time on it. Her daily schedule was distributed to her employees and she was available if needed. The evening hours were devoted to her family, giving individual time to her teenage children.

In 1999, she participated in the Honolulu Habitat for Humanity's Women Build. She was named 1999 Woman of Distinction by Hawaii's Girl Scouts for her work in motivating young women.

In 2001, she proposed turning Washington Place into a museum telling the story of Lili‘uokalani. Toward that end, she created the Washington Place Foundation to raise funds to build a new residence for the state's governor. The new residence, constructed directly behind Washington Place, was finished in time for the new governor Linda Lingle.

Recent career 
After her tenure as first lady, Cayetano continued to oversee United Laundry Services. She was named Sales Person of the Year for 2011 by Sales & Marketing Executives International, Honolulu Chapter.

In 2018, the 30th anniversary of United Laundry Services, Cayetano was honored with the Pacific Business News "Women Who Mean Business" Career Achievement Award. The following year, the University of Hawaii's School of Travel Industry Management presented Cayetano with the 2019 Legacy in Tourism Award.

Cayetano also volunteers on the board of directors for the Hawaii Symphony Orchestra.

On August 30, 2021, Cayetano announced her candidacy for the 2022 Hawaii gubernatorial election to succeed term-limited governor David Ige. On August 13, 2022, Cayetano lost the primary to Josh Green, 63%-21%.

Personal life 
Cayetano first married a financial consultant in California and had two children. The family later moved to Hawaii. She divorced her first husband in 1992.

Ben Cayetano was the sitting governor of Hawaii, with three grown children with his first wife, Lorraine Cayetano. They were separated for five years, then divorced in 1996 after 37 years of marriage. Cayetano and Tiu met while both were working out at the Honolulu Club fitness center. They were married one-and-a-half years later in the governor's official residence on May 5, 1997.

References

1950s births
American politicians of Filipino descent
Businesspeople from Hawaii
Filipino emigrants to the United States
First Ladies and Gentlemen of Hawaii
Living people
People from Manila
Women in Hawaii politics
Hawaii politicians of Filipino descent
21st-century American women